Katunets is a Bulgarian village in the Municipality of Ugarchin, northern Bulgaria. The village is situated near the towns of Lovech and Pleven. The 43,5 km long Katuneshka river flows through the village.

History

The first document mentioning Katunets is from the Turkish registries in 1840. According to the newspaper "Stremlenie" from 25 February 1912 the population of the village was around 2 750 people at the time. Katunets has soldiers from the Balkan War, the First World War and the second World war. The village school opened in 1914. A book about the village - "Katunets, small encyclopedia" was released by Vutzo Bobenski and Petar Bobenski.

Famous people

Veselin Toetev Belomazhov — Bulgarian ambassador to Denmark from 2 February 1973 to 1 January 1977.

Villages in Lovech Province